The 2006 Philippines Open (officially known as the Bingo Bonanza Philippines Open 2006  for sponsorship reasons) was badminton tournament which took place at the PhilSports Arena in Manila, Philippines, on from 24 to 28 May 2006 and had a total purse of $120,000.

Tournament 
The 2006 All England Open was the fifth tournament of the 2006 IBF World Grand Prix and also the inaugural tournament of the Philippines Open championships. The tournament was originally scheduled from 1 to 5 March, changed to May due to the state of emergency in the Philippines.

Venue 
This international tournament was held at PhilSports Arena in Manila, Philippines.

Point distribution 
Below is the point distribution table for each phase of the tournament based on the IBF points system for the IBF World Grand Prix 4-star event.

Prize pool 
The total prize money for this tournament was US$120,000. The distribution of the prize money was in accordance with IBF regulations.

Men’s singles

Seeds 

 Muhammad Hafiz Hashim (champion)
 Ng Wei (semi-finals)
 Boonsak Ponsana (semi-finals)
 Kuan Beng Hong (third round)
 Chan Yan Kit (quarter-finals)
 Andrew Smith (quarter-finals)
 Chetan Anand (third round)
 Sairul Amar Ayob (quarter-finals)
 Kendrick Lee Yen Hui (third round)
 Lee Tsuen Seng (third round)
 Jeffer Rosobin (second round)
 Yogendran Khrishnan (third round)
 Agus Hariyanto (first round)
 Nguyễn Tiến Minh (quarter-finals)
 Poompat Sapkulchananart (second round)
 Pei Wei Chung (first round)

Finals

Top half

Section 1

Section 2

Bottom half

Section 3

Section 4

Women’s singles

Seeds 

 Huaiwen Xu (quarter-finals)
 Yip Pui Yin (quarter-finals)
 Salakjit Ponsana (second round)
 Anu Nieminen (quarter-finals)
 Sutheaswari Mudukasan (first round)
 Anna Rice (first round)
 Agnese Allegrini (first round)
 Julia Wong Pei Xian (final)

Finals

Top half

Section 1

Section 2

Bottom half

Section 3

Section 4

Men’s doubles

Seeds 

 Robert Lin Woon Fui / Mohd Fairuzizuan Mohd Tazari (semi-finals)
 Patapol Ngernsrisuk / Sudket Prapakamol (quarter-finals)
 Hendra Aprida Gunawan / Joko Riyadi (final)
 Uki Kasah Yoga / Suryatama Yonathan (semi-finals)
 Eng Hian / Rian Sukmawan (quarter-finals)
 Rupesh Kumar K. T. / Sanave Thomas (quarter-finals)
 Nguyễn Quang Minh / Trần Thanh Hải (quarter-finals)
 Albertus Susanto Njoto / Yohan Hadikusumo Wiratama (champions)

Finals

Top half

Section 1

Section 2

Bottom half

Section 3

Section 4

Women's doubles

Seeds 

 Chin Eei Hui / Wong Pei Tty (semi-finals)
 Sathinee Chankrachangwong / Saralee Thungthongkam (semi-finals)
 Duanganong Aroonkesorn / Kunchala Voravichitchaikul (quarter-finals)
 Jo Novita / Greysia Polii (champions)
 Lita Nurlita / Natalia Christine Poluakan (quarter-finals)
 Fong Chew Yen / Ooi Sock Ai (second round)
 Koon Wai Chee / Wong Man Ching (second round)
 Mooi Hing Yau / See Phui Leng (second round)

Finals

Top half

Section 1

Section 2

Bottom half

Section 3

Section 4

Mixed doubles

Seeds 

 Songphon Anugritayawon / Kunchala Voravichitchaikul (quarter-finals)
 Sudket Prapakamol / Saralee Thungthongkam (champions)
 Kennevic Asuncion / Kennie Asuncion (final)
 Trần Thanh Hải / Lê Ngọc Nguyên Nhung (quarter-finals)
 Tri Kusharjanto / Minarti Timur (semi-finals)
 Nuttaphon Narkthong / Duanganong Aroonkesorn (second round)
 Muhammad Rijal / Greysia Polii (semi-finals)
 Klaus Raffeiner / Agnese Allegrini (quarter-finals)

Finals

Top half

Section 1

Section 2

Bottom half

Section 3

Section 4

References

External links 
Official website
Results

2006 IBF World Grand Prix
Philippines Open
Sports competitions in Manila